Public domain refers to works whose intellectual property rights have expired, have been forfeited, or are inapplicable.

Public domain may also refer to:

Public domain (land), lands maintained by a public entity that cannot be sold, since they are considered to belong to the whole community
Public Domain (film), 2003 Canadian film
Public Domain (band), a Scottish dance music act
 Public Domain (album), a 2000 album by Dave Alvin
 The Public Domain (film), a 2015 drama film

See also
Commons:Help:Public domain, for help with tagging Wikimedia Commons files as public domain
Public record, widely known or otherwise widely available information, sometimes erroneously described with the term "public domain" from intellectual property law
Public-access television, a form of non-commercial mass media